Cangas, also known as Cangas do Morrazo, is a seaside resort in southwestern Galicia, Spain. It is both a town and municipality in the province of Pontevedra. Its area is about 38,1 km² and has a population of around 26,087 inhabitants.

Government
The municipality of Cangas is administered by a mayor-council government, the Concello de Cangas, which meets in the Casa do Concello on Avenida Castelao. After the local elections of 2015 the municipality is governed by a coalition of Cangas Left Alternative (coalition of United Left and the FPG), the Galician Nationalist Bloc and Assembly for Unity (ASpUN).

Geography

Parishes
The municipality of Cangas is divided into six parishes:
 Aldán (San Cibrán)
 Cangas (Santiago)
 Coiro (San Salvador)
 Darbo (Santa María de Afuera)
 O Hío (San Andrés)

Culture

Religious 
Each parish has its own religious festival which honours the patron saint of the parish and smaller, minor festivals dedicated to the patron saints of local chapels. These celebrations both start and end with the firing of fireworks followed by a religious service.

 Cangas	
 Fiestas del Cristo del Consuelo, Last Sunday of August.

 Darbo
 Fiestas de San Blas, 3 February
 Fiestas de Santa Marta, Last Saturday of July
 Fiestas de San Pedro, End of June
 Romería de San Roque, 3rd week of August
 Romería de Darbo, 6,7,8 and 9 September.

 Coiro
 Fiestas del Espíritu Santo, Pentecost
 Fiestas de Santo Domingo, Start of August
 Fiestas de San Salvador, 6 & 7 August
 Fiestas de San Cosme, 26 September
 Fiestas do muiño, 1st Sunday of May.

 Aldán
 Fiestas de San Amaro, Mid-January
 Fiestas de Santa Mariña, 18 July
 Fiestas del Carmen, Last weekend of July

 Hío
 Fiestas del Cristo d e la Luz, 1st Sunday of July
 Fiestas de Santiago de Donón, 25 July
 Fiestas de San Lorenzo, 10 August
 Fiestas de San Andrés, 30 November
 Fiesta del Aguardiente, Weekend prior to the Fiestas del Cristo de la Luz.

Twin towns 
  Lajes do Pico (2003)

Notable people 
María Soliño, alleged witch
Xohán de Cangas, troubador
Ángel Botello, painter, sculptor and graphic artist (1913-1986)
Bernardino Graña, writer (1932-)
Suso Soliño, handball player (1975-)
Carlos Pérez,  canoer (1979-)
David Cal,  canoer (1982-)
Teresa Portela, canoer (1982-)
Solange Pereira, athlete (1989-)

References

External links
Concello de Cangas do Morrazo

Municipalities in the Province of Pontevedra